A Bicycle Master Plan is a published development plan describing long-range objectives for developing bicycle infrastructure in a city or region.  It may include bicycle paths, protected bicycle lanes, bicycle parking, and integration with public transit
as ways to promote bicycling as a viable transportation option.

Many cities have a Bicycle Master Plan, including Seattle, Los Angeles, Portland (Oregon), and Vancouver.

Models to estimate how bicycling can improve health outcomes of residents living in specific census tracts within a city have been developed in Norfolk, VA and San Francisco, CA to inform the Bicycle Master Plan.

See also
Bicycle transportation planning in Los Angeles

Notes

Cycling books
Bicycle law
Bicycle transportation planning